Members of the New South Wales Legislative Council who served in the 49th Parliament were elected at the 1981, 1984 and 1988 elections. Members served for three terms of the Legislative Assembly, which, as a result of the 1981 referendum meant the maximum term was twelve years. The 15 members elected in 1981 did not face re-election until 1992, the 15 members elected in 1984 did not face re-election until 1996 and the 15 members elected in 1988 did not face re-election until 2000. The terms of members were cut short by the 1991 referendum which reduced the term to two terms of the Legislative Assembly, a maximum of 8 years. The President was Johno Johnson.

References

Members of New South Wales parliaments by term
20th-century Australian politicians